Jaqueline Adina Cristian (born 5 June 1998) is a professional tennis player from Romania.

Cristian has career-high WTA rankings of 58 in singles and 168 in doubles. Up to date, she has won 12 singles and ten doubles titles on tournaments of the ITF Circuit.

Career

2015–2020: WTA Tour debut
Cristian made her WTA Tour main-draw debut at the 2015 Bucharest Open in the doubles event, partnering Elena-Gabriela Ruse. In March 2017, she received a qualifying wildcard for the Miami Open.

Cristian reached her maiden WTA tournament final at the 2019 Bucharest Open in the doubles event, partnering Elena-Gabriela Ruse.

2021: Breakthrough & top 100
She reached the quarterfinals of a WTA event for the first time as a qualifier at the WTA 500 St. Petersburg Ladies' Trophy where she lost to fourth seed Svetlana Kuznetsova. In September, she reached the first semifinals of a WTA tournament at the Astana Open. She reached the quarterfinals of the first edition of the Transylvania Open as a wildcard where she lost to top seed Simona Halep. She reached top 100 on 8 November 2021. At the Linz Open, she reached the final as a lucky loser following Halep’s withdrawal due to injury from the semifinal but lost it to Alison Riske, in three sets. As a result, she moved 29 positions up in the rankings, having been ranked world No. 100 at the beginning of the tournament.

2022: Grand Slam debut in singles and doubles
She made her major debut in Melbourne, at the Australian Open.
At the same event, she reached the third round of the doubles draw on her debut, partnering Andrea Petkovic.

Performance timelines

Only main-draw results in WTA Tour, Grand Slam tournaments, Fed Cup/Billie Jean King Cup and Olympic Games are included in win–loss records.

Singles
Current through the 2023 Linz Open.

Doubles

WTA career finals

Singles: 1 (runner-up)

Doubles: 1 (runner-up)

ITF Circuit finals

Singles: 17 (12 titles, 5 runner–ups)

Doubles: 20 (10 titles, 10 runner–ups)

Notes

References

External links

 
 
 

Romanian female tennis players
1998 births
Living people
21st-century Romanian women